Paul Brickman (born April 23, 1949) is an American screenwriter and film director. He is best known for writing and directing Risky Business.

Early life
Brickman was born in Chicago and raised in suburban Highland Park, the son of Shirley (née Kronenthal) and Morrie Brickman.  His father was a cartoonist who created the popular comic strip "The Small Society."

Brickman graduated from Highland Park High School in 1967. He graduated from Claremont Men's College in Claremont, California.

Career
Brickman began his career by writing the screenplays for The Bad News Bears in Breaking Training and Handle with Care, both of which were released in 1977.

In 1983, he made his directorial debut with Risky Business, starring Tom Cruise. Much of the film was filmed in Brickman's hometown, Highland Park, Illinois, and the surrounding area. However, the film was set in nearby Glencoe. The film was a major success, though Brickman felt disillusioned at having to compromise on the ending.

In 1990, he cowrote and directed Men Don't Leave, a loose adaptation of the 1982 French film La Vie Continue.

Brickman shared writing credit with Jon Avnet (the producer of Risky Business) on the 2001 NBC miniseries Uprising.

His only other directing credit is a short film called Allison (2012).

Filmography

References

External links

1949 births
Writers from Chicago
Living people
American male screenwriters
American film directors
Claremont McKenna College alumni
Screenwriters from Illinois
Screenwriters from California

People from Highland Park, Illinois